Listed are all Major League Baseball (MLB) players with 1,000 or more career runs scored. Players in bold face are active as of the 2022 Major League Baseball season.

Key

List
Stats updated through the 2022 season.

Through the end of the 2022 season, these active players have at least 850 runs:

Evan Longoria (992) 31 in 2022
José Altuve (986) 103 in 2022
Carlos Santana (917) 52 in 2022
Bryce Harper (913) 63 in 2022
Charlie Blackmon (880) 60 in 2022
Mookie Betts (870) 117 in 2022

Notes

External links
Major League Baseball

Runs scored 1000
Major League Baseball statistics